Pál Szűcs (26 March 1906 – 15 January 1969) was a Hungarian painter. His work was part of the painting event in the art competition at the 1932 Summer Olympics.

References

1906 births
1969 deaths
20th-century Hungarian painters
Hungarian painters
Olympic competitors in art competitions
People from Budapest
Hungarian male painters
20th-century Hungarian male artists